The year 2010 is the 14th year in the history of M-1 Global, a mixed martial arts promotion based in Russia. In 2010 M-1 Global held 37 events beginning with, M-1 Selection 2010: Western Europe Round 1.

Events list

M-1 Selection 2010: Western Europe Round 1

M-1 Selection 2010: Western Europe Round 1 was an event held on February 5, 2010, at Studio 31 in Hilversum, North Holland, Netherlands.

Results

M-1 Selection 2010: Eastern Europe Round 1

M-1 Selection 2010: Eastern Europe Round 1 was an event held on February 26, 2010, at The Yubileyny Sports Palace in Saint Petersburg, Leningrad Oblast, Russia.

Results

M-1 Selection 2010: Asia Round 1

M-1 Selection 2010: Asia Round 1 was an event held on March 5, 2010, at Olympic Hall in Seoul, South Korea.

Results

M-1 Challenge: Belarus

M-1 Challenge: Belarus was an event held on March 20, 2010, in Brest, Belarus.

Results

M-1 Selection 2010: Western Europe Round 2

M-1 Selection 2010: Western Europe Round 2 was an event held on March 27, 2010, at Studio 11 in Weesp, North Holland, Netherlands.

Results

M-1 Selection 2010: The Americas Round 1

M-1 Selection 2010: The Americas Round 1 was an event held on April 3, 2010, at Bally's Atlantic City in Atlantic City, New Jersey, United States.

Results

M-1 Selection 2010: Eastern Europe Round 2

M-1 Selection 2010: Eastern Europe Round 2 was an event held on April 10, 2010, at The National Circus of Ukraine in Kyiv, Ukraine.

Results

M-1 Selection 2010: Japan Round 1

M-1 Selection 2010: Japan Round 1 was an event held on April 16, 2010, at Shinjuku Face in Tokyo, Japan.

Results

M-1 Ukraine: 2010 Selections 1

M-1 Ukraine: 2010 Selections 1 was an event held on April 29, 2010, at Simferopol Circus in Simferopol, Crimea, Ukraine.

Results

Northwestern League of Combat Sambo: Tournament in Memory of Marshal Zhukov

Northwestern League of Combat Sambo: Tournament in Memory of Marshal Zhukov was an event held on April 29, 2010, at Etazh club in Saint Petersburg, Russia.

Results

M-1 Selection Ukraine 2010: Round 2

M-1 Selection Ukraine 2010: Round 2 was an event held on May 7, 2010, at National Circus in Kyiv, Ukraine.

Results

M-1 Selection 2010: Western Europe Reserve Matches

M-1 Selection 2010: Western Europe Reserve Matches was an event held on May 8, 2010, at The Wellness Profi Center in Pumerand, North Holland, Netherlands.

Results

M-1 Georgia: M-1 Georgia 2010

M-1 Georgia: M-1 Georgia 2010 was an event held on May 15, 2010, in Tbilisi, Georgia.

Results

M-1 Selection 2010: Eastern Europe Round 3

M-1 Selection 2010: Eastern Europe Round 3 was an event held on May 28, 2010, at The National Circus of Ukraine in Kyiv, Ukraine.

Results

M-1 Selection 2010: Western Europe Round 3

M-1 Selection 2010: Western Europe Round 3 was an event held on May 29, 2010, at The Helsinki Ice Hall in Helsinki, Uusimaa, Finland.

Results

M-1 Belarus: Belarus vs. Ukraine

M-1 Belarus: Belarus vs. Ukraine was an event held on June 4, 2010, at Bobruysk Arena in Bobruysk, Mogilev Region, Belarus.

Results

M-1 Selection 2010: The Americas Round 2

M-1 Selection 2010: The Americas Round 2 was an event held on June 26, 2010, at Bally's Atlantic City in Atlantic City, New Jersey, United States.

Results

M-1 Selection 2010: Asia Finals

M-1 Selection 2010: Asia Finals was an event held on July 3, 2010, at Tokyo Dome City Hall in Tokyo, Japan.

Results

M-1 Fighter 2010: Stage 1

M-1 Fighter 2010: Stage 1 was an event held on July 10, 2010, in Saint Petersburg, Russia.

Results

Sambo-70 / M-1 Global: Sochi Open European Championships

Sambo-70 / M-1 Global: Sochi Open European Championships was an event held on July 14, 2010, in Sochi, Russia.

Results

M-1 Selection 2010: Eastern Europe Finals

M-1 Selection 2010: Eastern Europe Finals was an event held on July 22, 2010, in Moscow, Russia.

Results

M-1 Selection 2010: The Americas Round 3

M-1 Selection 2010: The Americas Round 3 was an event held on August 7, 2010, at Bally's Atlantic City in Atlantic City, New Jersey, United States.

Results

M-1 Fighter: Elimination Round

M-1 Fighter: Elimination Round was an event held on August 8, 2010, in Saint Petersburg, Russia.

Results

M-1 Selection Ukraine 2010: Round 3

M-1 Selection Ukraine 2010: Round 3 was an event held on August 10, 2010, at Genova Fortress Hall in Sudak, Crimea, Ukraine.

Results

M-1 Global: Battle on the Neva 4

M-1 Global: Battle on the Neva 4 was an event held on August 19, 2010, at The Flying Dutchman in Saint Petersburg, Russia.

Results

Northwestern League of Combat Sambo: Tournament in Memory of Partisan German

Northwestern League of Combat Sambo: Tournament in Memory of Partisan German was an event held on September 11, 2010, in Saint Petersburg, Russia.

Results

M-1 Selection 2010: The Americas Finals

M-1 Selection 2010: The Americas Finals was an event held on September 18, 2010, at Bally's Atlantic City in Atlantic City, New Jersey, United States.

Results

M-1 Selection Ukraine 2010: Clash of the Titans

M-1 Selection Ukraine 2010: Clash of the Titans was an event held on September 18, 2010, at Acco International Exhibition Center in Kyiv, Ukraine.

Results

M-1 Global: M-1 Ukraine Battle of Lions

M-1 Global: M-1 Ukraine Battle of Lions was an event held on October 1, 2010, at Lviv Circus in Lviv, Lviv Oblast, Ukraine.

Results

M-1 Selection Belarus: First Round

M-1 Selection Belarus: First Round was an event held on October 17, 2010, in Bobruysk, Mogilev Region, Belarus.

Results

Northwestern League of Combat Sambo: Tournament in Memory of Private Korzun

Northwestern League of Combat Sambo: Tournament in Memory of Private Korzun was an event held on October 23, 2010, at Taifun Club in Saint Petersburg, Russia.

Results

M-1 Selection Ukraine 2010: Round 5

M-1 Selection Ukraine 2010: Round 5 was an event held on October 24, 2010, in Donetsk, Donetsk Oblast, Ukraine.

Results

M-1 Challenge 21: Guram vs. Garner

M-1 Challenge 21: Guram vs. Garner was an event held on October 28, 2010, at The Ice Palace Saint Petersburg in Saint Petersburg, Leningrad Oblast, Russia.

Results

M-1 Selection Belarus: Quarterfinals

M-1 Selection Belarus: Quarterfinals was an event held on November 6, 2010, in Brest, Belarus.

Results

M-1 Selection Ukraine 2010: Round 6

M-1 Selection Ukraine 2010: Round 6 was an event held on November 6, 2010, at The Acco International Exhibition Center in Kyiv, Ukraine.

Results

M-1 Ukraine: Battle of Champions

M-1 Ukraine: Battle of Champions was an event held on November 26, 2010, at Simferopol Circus in Simferopol, Crimea, Ukraine.

Results

M-1 Challenge 22: Narkun vs. Vasilevsky

M-1 Challenge 22: Narkun vs. Vasilevsky was an event held on December 10, 2010, at Druzhba Arena in Moscow, Russia.

Results

Northwestern League of Combat Sambo: Tournament in Memory of Marshal Govorov

Northwestern League of Combat Sambo: Tournament in Memory of Marshal Govorov was an event held on December 25, 2010, at Taifun Club in Saint Petersburg, Russia.

Results

M-1 Selection Belarus: Finals

M-1 Selection Belarus: Finals was an event held on December 25, 2010, at The Minsk Sports Hall in Minsk, Belarus.

Results

See also 
 M-1 Global

References

M-1 Global events
2010 in mixed martial arts